Amara is an Austronesian language spoken by about 1200 individuals along the northwest coast of West New Britain Province, Papua New Guinea on the island of New Britain.  Speakers have close to 100% bilingualism with Bariai, and many also speak Tok Pisin.

References

Ngero–Vitiaz languages
Western Oceanic languages